The 2006 Malaysian Grand Prix (officially the 2006 Formula 1 Petronas Malaysian Grand Prix) was a Formula One motor race held at the Sepang International Circuit in Selangor, Malaysia on 19 March 2006. The 56-lap race was the second round of the 2006 Formula One season and the eighth running of the Malaysian Grand Prix as a World Championship race. It was won by Renault driver Giancarlo Fisichella, who took the final of his three victories in Formula One, and scored his first points of the season. He had also started on pole position. His team-mate, Fernando Alonso, finished second to extend his lead in the drivers' championship standings to 7 points. Jenson Button took the first podium in Honda's three year return to the sport by finishing in third place. Fisichella's victory was also the last of an Italian driver .

Qualifying on Saturday saw the new rules being put to the test, as David Coulthard, Felipe Massa, Michael Schumacher, Rubens Barrichello and Ralf Schumacher were all forced to swap engines from the Bahrain GP and therefore lost 10 places on the starting grid after qualifying, despite many of them competing in later sessions (Massa actually changed his engine twice, causing him to lose 20 places). This meant some drivers, such as the Toro Rosso's of Scott Speed and Vitantonio Liuzzi were eliminated in the first session, but would have been spared elimination had those with engine penalties been eliminated at this point (although Ralf Schumacher's engine blew during the last session). Three cars with the Ferrari V8 suffered from engine problems during qualifying.

Report

Friday drivers
The bottom 6 teams in the 2005 Constructors' Championship and Super Aguri were entitled to run a third car in free practice on Friday. These drivers drove on Friday but did not compete in qualifying or the race.

Qualifying

The first session gave no surprises, as the Super Aguri, Midland and Toro Rosso cars all went out, while the second session saw another set of poor performances from Rubens Barrichello and Jarno Trulli, while Massa and Coulthard also went out along with both the Sauber cars. In the final pole position session, Ralf Schumacher's engine blew, while Fernando Alonso could only manage 7th place after a problem with his fuel calculation meant he was carrying too much fuel during the session. Kimi Räikkönen was tipped as a favourite having qualified 6th, while Juan Pablo Montoya put himself on the third row alongside his teammate in 5th. The two big surprises of qualifying were Nico Rosberg and Mark Webber in their Williams. Rosberg posted the third fastest time, while Webber was moved up to 4th after Michael Schumacher's engine penalty dropped him to 14th. Jenson Button took provisional pole, but it was Giancarlo Fisichella who ended the session in 1st with his Renault, demoting Button to 2nd.

Race

It was a slightly cooler day than previously, a little overcast and with a possibility of rain later in the race. The track and air temperatures were in the mid thirties but the humidity was still very high for 56 laps of the Sepang circuit.

At the start, pole-sitter Fisichella made a clean getaway, as did second-placed Button. The Williams drivers were having a little battle of their own, Nico Rosberg pushing Mark Webber wide as he tried to defend his third spot, and a flying Alonso took advantage as they squabbled. The Spaniard went round the outside of turn one to take third.

Kimi Räikkönen was a first lap casualty when his McLaren rear ended into the barriers with a suspected suspension failure, thanks to a nerf from behind by Christian Klien's Red Bull. It was hard to see what happened but Klien was in the pits quickly afterwards with suspension damage to the front of his car. Red Bull's David Coulthard was up to 11th from 19th, the Toyota of Ralf Schumacher from 22nd to 13th, Ferrari's Felipe Massa from 21st to 14th and Rubens Barrichello moved his Honda up from 20th to 15th.

Michael Schumacher, who dropped 10 places in qualifying due to his engine change, started 14th and got his Ferrari up to 10th in the opening laps. At the front it was Fisichella leading Button and Alonso, then came Webber and the remaining McLaren of Juan Pablo Montoya.

BMW Sauber's Nick Heidfeld had a good start and had improved to sixth, followed by Rosberg, who had dropped down a little after the skirmish with Webber at the start. Rosberg got past Heidfeld but the move and his efforts in qualifying came to nothing when the Cosworth V8 let go in a cloud of smoke and flames a couple of laps later. Webber was closing on Alonso and Heidfeld was back to sixth, with Montoya still between him and Webber. Rosberg's exit had promoted the second BMW Sauber of Jacques Villeneuve into eighth, while Michael and Coulthard had moved up to complete the top 10.

Ralf and Massa were also still improving, 11th and 12th respectively, but for Red Bull it was game over. They had managed to get Klien back out on track after the incident with Räikkönen but he had problems. Meanwhile, Coulthard had gone into the pits stuck in sixth gear and their respective woes ended in a double retirement for the team. Back on track Michael had dispatched Villeneuve for seventh and Fisichella was belting out fastest laps at the front. Behind Ralf and Massa, 10th and 11th by then, was the Toro Rosso of Scott Speed and Barrichello, who was struggling to make up ground as quickly as his fellow back-of-the-grid starters had done.

Trulli, who was running sixth, hardly seemed to put up a fight as he was overtaken by Michael, Villeneuve and Massa all in successive laps at the same corner, turn one. Webber and Ralf were the ones who kicked off the first pit stops, around lap 15, but Webber then exited the race with a hydraulic problem.
Fisichella went in for his first stop a couple of laps later, leaving Button in the lead until the Honda also dived in. That promoted Alonso to the front, but while the Spaniard went 10 laps further into the race than teammate Fisichella did before visiting the pits, he was still on a two-stopper.

Further down the field MF1's Christijan Albers was up to 13th, followed by the Super Aguri of Takuma Sato and Tonio Liuzzi's Toro Rosso. The second MF1 of Tiago Monteiro was next and the last of the remaining cars on track was Yuji Ide's Super Aguri. They were all having their own little fights but the attention was firmly on the front.

Alonso led Fisichella and Button rejoined behind third-placed Montoya after his stop. He was pressuring the McLaren, but not really too hard as Montoya was yet to pit. Heidfeld was doing a calm and controlled job in fifth, followed by Michael, Villeneuve and Massa up into the points in eighth.

However, due to the different strategies the pit stop shakeout was not yet complete. Next into the pits were Michael, Montoya and Villeneuve, which left Alonso, Massa and Barrichello the last to go in. Alonso finally ducked in on lap 26 but evidently would have to stop again. He rejoined third behind Fisichella and Button.

Massa was up to fourth when he went in and rejoined eighth, and the Ferrari youngster did not have to stop again. Barrichello was also on a one-stopper and was last to make his way into the pits but the strategy was wasted when a few laps later he got a 10-second stop and go penalty for speeding in the pit lane.

Ide was the next to retire, with an unspecified mechanical problem, and the Super Aguri pulled off on the grass. Barrichello, who had been held up by a scrap between Sato and Monteiro, went in for his penalty, and Button got similarly stuck behind Sato and one of the Toro Rosso cars who were then having a duel.

Fisichella took his second stop and Button dived in as well to escape the traffic. They retained formation and rejoined in second and fourth with Montoya in between them. Alonso was back in the lead until his second stop and had just enough time in his pocket to charge through for a quick splash-and-dash and get out ahead of Button.

Michael went in for his second stop and it was a close call with teammate Massa as he rejoined the track. The Brazilian didn't back off and led Michael through turn one, although the German was very close. Massa stayed there to the chequered flag, with Michael tagging behind for the remaining 10 laps or so, unable to get past.

With only eight laps to go Heidfeld, who had been doing a sterling, if quiet, job for BMW in fifth, suffered an engine failure. In the final laps Liuzzi got past Albers for 11th, which will probably make MF1 start complaining about Toro Rosso's V10 again, and somewhere along the line Speed retired with a suspected clutch problem. Positions held to the flag and Fisichella took the victory ahead of teammate Alonso and Button.

Classification

Qualifying

Notes
 — Michael Schumacher was handed a 10 place grid penalty following an engine change after the Saturday morning practice session.
 — Ralf Schumacher was handed a 10 place grid penalty following an engine change after his engine blew during the second session. Resultantly he was unable to compete in the final part of qualifying - Q3.
 — David Coulthard and Rubens Barrichello were also handed 10 place grid penalties following engine changes.
 — Felipe Massa was handed a 10 place grid penalty following an engine change prior to the qualifying session. To conserve the engine he sat out the second qualifying session - Q2.

Race

Championship standings after the race

Drivers' Championship standings

Constructors' Championship standings

 Note: Only the top five positions are included for both sets of standings.

References

External links
 Detailed Malaysian Grand Prix results (archived)

Malaysian Grand Prix
Malaysian Grand Prix
Grand Prix
Malaysian Grand Prix